for others with the same name, see Untamed (disambiguation)

Untamed is a 1940 American Technicolor adventure film directed by George Archainbaud and starring Ray Milland, Patricia Morison and Akim Tamiroff. It is based on the 1926 Sinclair Lewis novel Mantrap.

Plot
A doctor takes a hunting trip to the Canadian wilderness. When he gets badly mauled by a bear, his life is saved by his guide Joe Easter.

Easter takes the doctor to his cabin, where he is nursed to recovery by Easter's young beautiful wife Alverna, and they fall in love. Easter leaves for an extended hunting trip while the doctor and Alverna grapple with their feelings for each other, a blizzard and an epidemic.

Cast
 Ray Milland as Dr. William Crawford
 Patricia Morison as Alverna Easter
 Akim Tamiroff as Joe Easter
 William Frawley as Les Woodbury
 Jane Darwell as Mrs. Maggie Moriarty
 Esther Dale as Mrs. Smith
 J.M. Kerrigan as Angus McGavity
 Eily Malyon as Mrs. Sarah McGavity
 Fay Helm as Miss Olcott
 Clem Bevans as 'Smokey' Moseby, the Blind Man
 Sibyl Harris as Mrs. Dillon
 Roscoe Ates as Bert Dillon
 J. Farrell MacDonald as Doctor Billar
 Gertrude Hoffman as Miss Rhine (as Gertrude W. Hoffman)
 Charles Waldron as Doctor Hughes
 Darryl Hickman as Mickey Moriarty 
 Charlene Wyatt as Milly Dee
 Bahe Denetdeel as Skookum
 Donna Jean Lester as Judy

External links 
 

1940 films
1940 adventure films
Films scored by Victor Young
Films based on American novels
Films based on works by Sinclair Lewis
Films directed by George Archainbaud
Films set in Canada
Medical-themed films
Paramount Pictures films
American adventure films
1940s American films